Bukkulla is a hamlet about  north of Inverell and north-east of Bannockburn on the Ashford Road. This hamlet is within the boundaries of Arrawatta County and Inverell Shire, New South Wales, Australia. The village is at an elevation of about 580 metres.

History
Bukkulla was the name of the  property of George Wyndham (1801–1870) and means 'place of leopard tree' or a ‘high black stump’.  Wyndham was the first official licensee when he held the Macintyre River property in 1839. The 1841 census recorded Bukkulla as having 3 free males, 1 convict there. Wyndham started a vineyard there along with a Thoroughbred horse stud which bred some good horses. The Bukkulla stud also produced some good stockhorses and horses for the Indian trade, too. In 1850 there were 300 horses, 2,000 cattle and 7,000 sheep on Bukkulla. The property was later subdivided by Wyndham Brothers into Karoola, Redbank, Arthur's Seat, Dinton Vale and Westholme, etc.

Bukkulla Post Office opened on 1 April 1876 and closed in 1980.

The district's primary industries are sheep and beef cattle breeding.

The village now has a sports ground, a public telephone, several homes and a communications tower. Macintyre Station is nearby.

Citations

References
The Beardies Heritage, Poly-Graphics Pty. Ltd., Brisbane, 1972

External links
 

Towns in New South Wales
Towns in New England (New South Wales)
Inverell Shire